Ohio is a major research and development center, home to many institutions.

Overview
In 2008, institutions and companies in the state won 10 R&D 100 Awards, given annually to the top 100 innovations recognized by R&D Magazine, finishing second behind California. Ohio State University is among the country's top public research institutions at #7. Ohio is ranked in the top eight for states conducting clinical trials, including conducting the most clinical trials per capita.

In 2006, the state had a high-tech payroll of $9.8 billion, with 155,174 high-tech employees at 10,756 high tech locations. In 2005, industry in Ohio spent $5.9 billion on research and development, with colleges spending $1.5 billion, but by 2009, $8.2 billion in R&D contracts were identified, ranking 13th nationally. Ohio receives around $2.7 billion annually in federal R&D funds, ranking #9.

In 2005, it was ranked #4 in the country in industrial R&D activities, while the University of Dayton and Ohio State University ranked #2 and #3 nationally in total materials research. Ohio leads the nation in plastics and rubber research.

On July 30, 2010, the state approved a $3.5 million grant to convert the old NCR headquarters in Dayton into a collaborative innovation center. The Miami Valley Research Park in southwestern Ohio is a 1,250 acre complex home to the headquarters of Woolpert, Inc. as well as ATX, WilmerHale, and Center for Tissue, Innovation and Research facilities. A fun note, in 2010 automotive racing star Jeff Gordon and his company, in partnership with Arshot Investment Corp., named their new research and development project in Columbus the "Center for Automotive Research & Technology at Cooper Park."

Government and non-profit

Government-operated and non-profit research and development institutions include:

University of Dayton Research Institute
Battelle Memorial Institute
Cleveland Clinic
Air Force Research Laboratory
National Center for Regenerative Medicine
Neurological Institute at Miami Valley Hospital
Center for Stem Cell and Regenerative Medicine
Center for Tissue Regeneration and Engineering at Dayton
Clinical Tissue Engineering Center
NASA Glenn Research Center
FDA Forensic Chemistry Center
a unit of the Army Research Laboratory
UES, Inc.
Naval Health Research Center Detachment Environmental Health Effects Laboratory
Environmental Protection Agency centers include a division of the National Exposure Research Laboratory, National Risk Management Research Laboratory, Breidenbach Environmental Research Center, Test and Evaluation Facility, Center Hill Facility, Experimental Stream Facility, Kerr Environmental Research Center, a unit of the National Center for Environmental Assessment
U.S. Department of Health and Human Services centers include divisions for Biomedical and Behavioral Sciences, Physical Sciences and Engineering, Education and Information, Surveillance, Hazards Evaluations, and Field Studies 
U.S. Department of Veterans Affairs centers include Stokes Cleveland Medical Center, Cincinnati Medical Center, and the Dayton VA Medical Center.
U.S. Department of Agriculture centers include Soil Drainage Research Unit, North Appalachian Experimental Watershed Research Unit, Delaware Forestry Sciences Laboratory, and ARS Research Facility
U.S. Department of Transportation's Vehicle Research and Test Center
U.S. Department of the Interior's Columbus Field Research Station
Ohio Coal Research Consortium
Ohio Aerospace Institute
Genome Research Institute
Center for Computational Medicine
Wright Center of Innovation
Fuel Cell Prototyping Center
Ohio Agricultural Research and Development Center
Ohio Center for Advanced Propulsion and Power

Private

Private institutions in Ohio conducting research and development include:

The Research Institute at Nationwide Children's Hospital
Procter & Gamble
B&C Research, Inc., a division of Alcoa
Honda of America
House Care Research Center
GE Aviation
Rolls-Royce
General Dynamics
MacAulay-Brown
Arctic Slope Regional Corporation
Ross Laboratories
Cardinal Health
Babcock & Wilcox Company Research Center
Keithley Instruments, Inc.
Swagelok Co.
Neoprobe
Amylin Pharmaceuticals
Bridgestone Technical Center
Charles River Laboratories Ashland (formerly WIL Research Laboratories)
Chemical Abstracts Service
Diagnostic Hybrids, Inc.
Parker Hannifin

Dana Holding Corporation
Delphi Technologies
Goodyear
PPG Industries
Ashland Chemical
Lincoln Electric
Rockwell Automation Technologies
Ethicon Endo-Surgery
Scotts Miracle-Gro
Global Cardiovascular Innovation Center
Nestlé
Pilkington North America
AK Steel
First Solar
Global Titanium Research and Development Center
North American Science Associates (NAMSA)

Collegiate

Collegiate institutions in Ohio conducting major research and development include:
Ohio State University
Case Western Reserve University
Cleveland State University
Miami University
University of Cincinnati
Wright State University

Medical College of Ohio
Kent State University
University of Toledo
University of Dayton
Ohio University
University of Akron
Bowling Green State University

References

Economy of Ohio
Research and development in the United States